Artyom Smirnov or Artem Smirnov may refer to:

 Artem Smirnov (tennis), Ukrainian tennis player
 Artyom Aleksandrovich Smirnov (b. 1989), Russian footballer, goalkeeper